Munno Para railway station is located on the Gawler line.

History

Munno Para station opened in 1978.

Originally consisting of two 95 metre side platforms, in March 2012, two new side platforms capable of accommodating six carriages were built 60 metres south of the original station. This was in connection with the plans to electrify the line, which was completed in early 2022 and expected to reopen on April 30. The platforms are connected by an overpass with lifts.

The station was the site of a fatal collision on 5 February 2019 where a man from Smithfield Plains who was illegally on the tracks was struck by a train and died at the scene.

Services by platform

Bus transfers

|}

References

Railway stations in Adelaide
Railway stations in Australia opened in 1978